Louis-Gabriel de Gomer (February 25, 1718 - July 30, 1798) was a French military officer, and inventor of the Gomer mortar. He was Marshal General of France and a Commander of the Order of Saint Louis in 1789, when he was elected as Deputy of the Estate General for Sarreguemines. He served as a member of the military committee until November 1789, when he resigned.

References
 Mémoires de l'Académie des sciences, des lettres et des arts d'Amiens, Volume 21, 1874

1718 births
1798 deaths
French military personnel
Counts of France
People from Somme (department)